Harvey James Howard (1880–1956) was an American ophthalmologist. He was notable for:
 Serving as head of the Ophthalmology Department at the University Medical School, Canton Christian College in China between 1910 and 1915.
 Inventing the Howard-Dolman apparatus for measuring the accuracy of perception of distance while serving as a captain in the US Army during World War I.
 Serving as head of the Department of Ophthalmology at Peking Union Medical College between 1917 and 1927.
 Serving as ophthalmologist to Pu Yi, the boy emperor in the Forbidden City, between 1921 and 1925.
 Being kidnapped, with his son, by Manchurian bandits in 1925 and escaping after ten weeks with the help of the Chinese army.
 Becoming the foundation Chair of the Department of Ophthalmology at Washington University School of Medicine in 1927.

Howard's research was on aviation medicine and on trachoma.

References

External links
Biography

American ophthalmologists
1880 births
1956 deaths
Washington University School of Medicine faculty